Bharat Kumar Chettri (born 15 December 1981 in Kalimpong, West Bengal) is an Indian field hockey player. He is the goalkeeper of the Indian hockey team.

Career
Chettri's professional career in field hockey began after he joined the Sports Authority of India's Centre of Excellence in Bangalore in 1998. He made his debut in international hockey in 2001 playing in the Prime Minister's Gold Cup tournament in Dhaka, Bangladesh. He was first appointed the captain of the Indian national team in October 2011 for the four-nation Super Series and an international tournament in Australia. He was the captain of the 18-member Indian squad at the 2012 Sultan Azlan Shah Cup in Malaysia, which won the bronze medal. Chettri led the 16-member Indian hockey squad in the 2012 Olympic Games in London.

Following poor performances at the Olympics, Chettri, Sandeep Singh and Shivendra Singh were dropped from the squad.

Hockey India League
In the auction of the first edition of the Hockey India League, Chettri was bought by Punjab Warriors for $19,000 with his base price being $18,500. He went unsold in the first round and was bought in the second round of auction.

References

External links
 Bharat Chettri's interview on ESPN-Star Sports
 Short Biography of Bharat Chettri

 

Living people
1981 births
People from Kalimpong district
Field hockey players from West Bengal
World Series Hockey players
Field hockey players at the 2012 Summer Olympics
Olympic field hockey players of India
Indian Gorkhas
Asian Games medalists in field hockey
Field hockey players at the 2002 Asian Games
Field hockey players at the 2006 Asian Games
Field hockey players at the 2010 Asian Games
Indian male field hockey players
Asian Games silver medalists for India
Asian Games bronze medalists for India
Commonwealth Games medallists in field hockey
Commonwealth Games silver medallists for India
Medalists at the 2002 Asian Games
Medalists at the 2010 Asian Games
Recipients of the Rajyotsava Award 2010
Field hockey players at the 2006 Commonwealth Games
Field hockey players at the 2010 Commonwealth Games
Recipients of the Dhyan Chand Award
2006 Men's Hockey World Cup players
Medallists at the 2010 Commonwealth Games